The 2018 Associate international cricket season was from July to August 2018. The International Cricket Council (ICC) granted Twenty20 International (T20I) status to matches between the women's national teams of all of its Associate members from 1 July 2018 (and between their men's national teams from 1 January 2019). As a result, many teams were able to play official WT20I cricket for the first time. The season included all WT20I cricket series mostly involving ICC Associate members, that were played in addition to series covered in International cricket in 2018.

Season overview

August

Singapore women in Malaysia

2018 Botswana Cricket Association Women's T20I Series

2018 South American Women's Cricket Championship

NB: Matches played by Peru were not recognised as official WT20Is as not all of their players met ICC eligibility criteria.

See also
 International cricket in 2018

References

2018 in cricket
International cricket competitions in 2018